Tyler Reed Dillon (born February 27, 1992) is an American professional stock car racing driver. He competes full-time in the NASCAR Cup Series, driving the No. 77 Chevrolet Camaro ZL1 for Spire Motorsports. He has also competed in the NASCAR Camping World Truck Series, what is now the ARCA Menards Series, what are now the ARCA Menards Series East and West and what is now known as the NASCAR Pinty's Series in the past.

He is the 2011 ARCA Racing Series champion and was the series' youngest champion at 19 years, 7 months and 19 days until Ty Gibbs broke this record when he won the 2021 ARCA Menards Series championship at 19 years, 0 months and 19 days.

Dillon has spent most of his NASCAR career driving for Richard Childress Racing and affiliated teams. RCR is owned by his grandfather Richard Childress. He is the younger brother of fellow NASCAR driver Austin Dillon, who drives RCR's No. 3 Cup Series car full-time. His father is RCR general manager Mike Dillon, who is a retired NASCAR driver.

Racing career

Early career

Dillon began his racing career in go-karts and  Bandoleros. Moving up to the K&N Pro Series East in 2009, he competed for the series championship in 2010, finishing 13th in points despite only competing in eight races of the series' ten-race schedule. He scored one win in the series, in August 2010 at Gresham Motorsports Park.

After making three starts and winning twice, at Kansas Speedway and Rockingham Speedway, in the ARCA Racing Series in 2010, Dillon ran his first full season in the series in 2011, winning seven times on his way to winning the series championship. He defeated Chris Buescher by a 340-point margin for the championship, but lost the series rookie-of-the-year award to Buescher by two points.

NASCAR

Camping World Truck Series
Dillon made his debut in the Camping World Truck Series in 2011, finishing eighteenth at Kentucky Speedway, in preparation for running the full series schedule for Richard Childress Racing in 2012. In only his second Truck Series start at Texas Motor Speedway, he finished third. At Homestead, he finished 6th, right in front of his brother Austin, who was crowned champion that night after the race was called due to rain.

In the 2012 NextEra Energy Resources 250 at Daytona, he finished 9th. The following race at Martinsville saw Dillon score his best career finish, 2nd, finishing behind teammate Kevin Harvick. He recorded top ten finishes in each of the first five Truck Series races of the year. On August 31, he scored his first career Truck Series win at Atlanta Motor Speedway.

Returning to the Camping World Truck Series in 2013, Dillon went on to win at Kentucky Speedway in the Camping World Truck Series on June 27 of that year. In late August 2013, Dillon was leading the final lap of the Truck Series' first race in Canada against 17-year-old rookie Chase Elliott. In the final turn, Dillon and Elliott made contact, with Dillon winding up hitting the tire barrier and Elliott winning the race. Dillon afterwards stated that the next time they raced each other "he won't finish the race". At Texas, Dillon won the 100th race for a No. 3 car/truck in NASCAR.

Dillon finished second in the 2013 NASCAR Camping World Truck Series standings, behind Matt Crafton; he was named the series' Most Popular Driver at the season-ending awards banquet.

In 2014, Dillon returned to the Truck Series for the Mudsummer Classic at Eldora Speedway, racing the same truck he had driven in the previous year's race. Dillon finished 5th in the event. Dillon later entered the final race of the season in the No. 9 for NTS Motorsports in place of Brennan Newberry, finishing 7th.

In 2015, Dillon drove three races in the No. 33 Chevrolet for GMS Racing at Daytona, Atlanta, and Eldora where he earned two top tens in these races. Dillon drove one race in the No. 31 Chevrolet for NTS Motorsports at Bristol where he was crashed late in the race.

Dillon returned to the CWTS in 2017 at Martinsville, driving the No. 99 Chevrolet Silverado for MDM Motorsports and finished 5th. Dillon also ran at Eldora for the Mudsummer Classic, finishing 12th.

Xfinity Series

In early June 2012, Dillon made his debut in the Nationwide Series in the 5-hour Energy 200 at Dover International Speedway. In July he finished third in the first Nationwide Series race held at Indianapolis Motor Speedway. In August 2013, it was announced that Dillon would be moving full-time to the Nationwide Series for 2014, where he would drive the No. 3 Chevrolet for RCR, replacing brother Austin.

Dillon won his first career Nationwide Series pole at Las Vegas.  He won a second pole which came at Kentucky.  His third career pole came at Kansas.

On July 26, 2014, at Indianapolis Motor Speedway, Dillon got by Kyle Busch on the final restart and held off Busch to win the race. Dillon finished second to Chase Elliott in the 2014 NNS Rookie of the Year standings.

In 2015, Dillon began with a third-place finish at the season opener at Daytona. On August 8, 2015, at Watkins Glen, Dillon was involved in a huge fight with Regan Smith when Dillon dumped Smith in turn one and caused Smith to finish in the 20th position. Despite going winless, Ty Dillon finished a career-best 3rd place in the final point standings for 2015 with a career-high in top-10s (25) and top-5s (12).

In 2016 at the season-opening race at Daytona, Dillon scored his fourth career Xfinity Series pole and his first since the 2014 season. Dillon brought home a $100,000 bonus by winning the Dash 4 Cash at Richmond finishing second, after the three other Dash 4 Cash drivers all crashed out of the race in the same wreck, late in the going. He finished 2nd to Dale Earnhardt Jr. in the race. Coming back to Daytona, Dillon drove a very special Bass Pro Shops/NRA Museum paint scheme for the July 4th weekend, in which he finished 14th place.

For 2016, NASCAR used the Chase format in the Xfinity Series. Dillon made the Chase in 2016 on points but was eliminated after a close battle with Justin Allgaier. Dillon finished 5th in points for 2016 with five season-best second-place finishes (Richmond, both Iowa races, Dover during the chase, and Homestead).

Dillon ran 27 Xfinity races in 2017; he did not run the Iowa races in June and July, Road America, Mid-Ohio, Kentucky in September, and Homestead. Although he moved up full-time to the Cup Series in 2017, Dillon continued to drive the No. 3 Chevrolet Camaro for RCR but now on a part-time basis. At the Xfinity opener at Daytona, Dillon was running up front until the last restart when he ran out of fuel and finished 19th. After two more bad finishes, Dillon began a four-race streak of top-ten finishes. He ended the season with 16 top tens.

In 2018, Dillon ran a few Xfinity races in the No. 3 Camaro as other drivers are sharing the same ride. He did not run any races in the series in 2019 and 2020.

On January 27, 2021, it was announced that Dillon would drive for Joe Gibbs Racing in their No. 54 Toyota part-time in the Xfinity Series in 2021, running the season opener at Daytona, Homestead, Las Vegas, and Talladega in the spring. He joined Our Motorsports for the Charlotte race in May.

Cup Series

Part-time (2014–2016)

On July 15, 2014, RCR announced Dillon will make his Sprint Cup Series debut in the No. 33 with Hillman-Circle Sport LLC in partnership with RCR in the Oral-B USA 500 at Atlanta Motor Speedway. After qualifying 29th, he finished 25th. Dillon returned to the No. 33 for the Quicken Loans Race for Heroes 500 at Phoenix International Raceway, qualifying 26th and finishing 27th.

In September 2014, sponsor Yuengling and RCR announced they would field the No. 33 for Dillon at the 2015 June Pocono race. On December 9, RCR stated Dillon would drive the No. 33 for Hillman-Circle Sport in the Daytona 500.

In 2016, Dillon joined Circle Sport – Leavine Family Racing, splitting the No. 95 with Michael McDowell with sponsorships from Cheerios and Nexteer among others. Like the 33, the 95 has an alliance with RCR. Dillon also ran the No. 14 for Stewart-Haas Racing, substituting for an injured Tony Stewart. Dillon would finish seventh at Talladega for the running of the GEICO 500, but the credit would go to Stewart since he started the race. At Pocono, Dillon would lead his first three laps in Sprint Cup competition. Dillon took over for Regan Smith in the No. 7 Tommy Baldwin Racing Chevy at the Teenage Mutant Ninja Turtles 400 as Smith flew back to North Carolina to await the birth of his child.

On November 28, 2016, it was announced that Dillon would replace veteran Casey Mears, who has been with Germain for six years, in the No. 13 GEICO-sponsored Chevrolet for Germain Racing in 2017. Along with GEICO, Twisted Tea was a primary sponsor of Germain Racing for a few races in 2017.

Germain Racing (2017–2020)
Dillon began the 2017 season with a crash in the Daytona 500. In the next race at Atlanta, he scored a 15th place outing. The next week at Las Vegas, he finished in 21st place. He followed this up with a 16th place finish at Phoenix, a 22nd place finish at Martinsville, and then a 17th place finish at Texas. He followed this finish with a 15th place finish outing at Bristol and then a 26th place finish outing at Richmond. At Talladega, Dillon finished a career-best 13th, after avoiding the 'Big One'. He followed this finish with a 14th place outing at Kansas. This was followed by a 36th place finish at Charlotte. Dillon led 27 laps at Dover and was running with the leaders but wrecked in overtime and finished 14th. At Daytona, Dillon had the lead with 3 to go but faded to 16th on the final restart. At Kentucky, Dillon finished 33rd.

In the second part of 2017, Dillon managed to score 8 top-20 finishes including two then career-best finishes of 11th. He finished 24th in the final points standings.

After a rough first half of 2018, Dillon managed to avoid several 'big ones' to finish a then career-best sixth place in the Coke Zero Sugar 400 at Daytona. This was Dillon's first career top-10 finish in the Cup Series in 71 starts.

To start the 2019 season, Dillon managed to score another 6th place finish, reminiscent of his previous Daytona top 10. Once again, he avoided multiple large wrecks to get 6th place. Dillon managed to run as high as 5th place in overtime. At Bristol, Dillon won his first stage ever after holding off Clint Bowyer in a two-lap shootout after a restart in stage 1, finishing the race in 15th. In the GEICO 500, Dillon won his second stage in his career, winning the first stage. Dillon also scored his first-ever top 5 finish and highest finish in his cup career at the rain-shortened July Daytona race, with a fourth-place. Along with Joey Logano, Dillon was running at the checkered flag at every single race run during the season. Like 2017, he finished 24th in points.

Dillons 2020 season started with him DNFing at that year's Daytona 500, finishing 30th. The next week at Las Vegas, Dillon finished 10th, his first top 10 at a non-plate track. For The Real Heroes 400 at Darlington, he'd start 33rd, determined after a random draw, and finish 19th. The starting positions for the upcoming Toyota 500 would be determined by inverting the top 20 finishers of The Real Heroes 400, giving Dillon a spot on the front row starting 2nd, alongside Ryan Preece. At the YellaWood 500 at Talladega on October 4, 2020, Dillon originally crossed the line and tied his best finish of fourth, but when Matt DiBenedetto was penalized for forcing someone below the yellow line, Dillon was promoted to third and that would be a new career-best finish for him. In Germain Racing's final season, Dillon finished 26th in the points standings.

On September 22, 2020, it was announced that Germain Racing would shut down after the 2020 season due to lack of sponsorship from Geico, and would sell their charter that guarantees the car would drive in every race in a season to the newly-formed 23XI Racing, led by Michael Jordan and Cup driver Denny Hamlin.

Gaunt Brothers Racing (2021)
After speculation for the previous few days, on January 19, 2021, it was announced that Dillon would attempt the 2021 Daytona 500 for Gaunt Brothers Racing driving the No. 96 Toyota with sponsorship from Bass Pro Shops and Black Rifle Coffee. This will be the first time that Dillon has not driven a Chevrolet in NASCAR and ARCA and gone outside of RCR and teams affiliated with RCR for a permanent ride in NASCAR. Before the 500, Dillon joined 23XI Racing for the Busch Clash in the No. 23 Toyota; he was eligible for the race due to winning a stage in the 2020 season, while regular driver Bubba Wallace was not. Despite finishing sixth in the first Duel of the 2021 Bluegreen Vacations Duels, Dillon missed the 2021 Daytona 500.

Petty GMS (2022)

On October 10, 2021, GMS Racing announced that Dillon would drive the No. 94 Chevrolet in their inaugural Cup season in 2022. On December 7, 2021, it was announced that Dillon's 2022 car number would change to the No. 42 alongside the No. 43 of Erik Jones as a teammate after GMS had purchased the majority interest of Richard Petty Motorsports. On July 16, 2022, Dillon confirmed that he would not return to the team in 2023. Prior to the Pocono race, the No. 42 was docked 35 driver and owner points for an L1 penalty when the pre-race inspection revealed issues on the car's rocker box vent hole. Dillon ended the season 29th in the points standings.

Spire Motorsports (2023)
On October 18, 2022, Spire Motorsports announced that Dillon would drive the No. 77 full-time in 2023.

Other racing

On June 16, 2014, Dillon announced he would make his Trans-Am Series debut at Road America for Miller Racing in the No. 12 TA2 Chevy Camaro. After starting 6th, Dillon finished 4th.

In popular culture

Television and film appearances
In 2019, Dillon made a cameo in the movie Stuber.

Personal life
Dillon grew up in the Piedmont Triad of North Carolina with his parents, Mike Dillon (who is a retired NASCAR driver and current RCR team executive) and Tina Dillon, and his brother Austin, who also drives in the Cup Series.

Dillon's grandfather is Richard Childress, a North Carolina businessman and former professional stock car racing driver who owns NASCAR team Richard Childress Racing.

On December 28, 2013, Dillon announced his engagement to his girlfriend Haley Carey, a former driver herself and Charlotte Hornets cheerleader. They were married by Dillon's good friend Ray Wright on December 20, 2014, at Childress Vineyards in Lexington, North Carolina. On November 20, 2017, the two welcomed a daughter, Oakley Ray Dillon. Their son Kapton Reed Dillon was born on October 29, 2020.

On May 26, 2017, Fin & Field named Dillon the Most Interesting Sportsman in the World for the Spring of 2017.

Dillon does weekly vlogs following his personal and racing life in a series called The Ride.

Dillon formerly co-owned sports management agency Team Dillon Management with his brother Austin which currently manages both themselves, John Hunter Nemechek, A. J. Allmendinger, Anthony Alfredo, Tanner Thorson, Kaulig Racing, Brian Gay, and Chris Stroud. On December 5, 2019, Dillon announced he would leave TDM and join fellow competitor Kevin Harvick’s KHI Management Agency.

Motorsports career results

NASCAR
(key) (Bold – Pole position awarded by qualifying time. Italics – Pole position earned by points standings or practice time. * – Most laps led.)

Cup Series

Daytona 500

Xfinity Series

Camping World Truck Series

 Season still in progress 
 Ineligible for series points

K&N Pro Series East

K&N Pro Series West

Canadian Tire Series

ARCA Racing Series
(key) (Bold – Pole position awarded by qualifying time. Italics – Pole position earned by points standings or practice time. * – Most laps led.)

References

External links

 
 Official profile at Spire Motorsports
 

Living people
1992 births
People from Lewisville, North Carolina
Racing drivers from North Carolina
NASCAR drivers
ARCA Menards Series drivers
Trans-Am Series drivers
Richard Childress Racing drivers
Stewart-Haas Racing drivers
Joe Gibbs Racing drivers